The 1906–07 Drake Bulldogs men's basketball team represents Drake University in the 1906–07 college basketball season. The team is led by first year head coach C.A. Pell. This was also Drakes first season of collegiate basketball. They finished with a 2–1 record.

Schedule

Notes

Drake Bulldogs men's basketball seasons
Drake
Drake Bulldogs men's basketball
Drake Bulldogs men's basketball